Nancy Hadley (born August 1, 1930) is an American retired model and actress, who performed on stage and in television and films.

Early life
She was born Nancy Jo Hadley at Methodist Hospital in Los Angeles, California. Her parents were Paul Edward Hadley, a dried fruit distributor, and Jessie Morisee Cummings. Her parents divorced when Hadley was a toddler; her mother, with whom Hadley lived, remarried. Hadley had two younger half-siblings from her father's second marriage.

Hadley graduated from Huntington Park High School in 1948. She then went to a modeling school, and later worked for modeling agencies.

Modeling career
From April 1950 on Hadley appeared in newspaper photo spreads as a model for California-based retail events, trade conventions, and fashion merchandise.

She also did television commercials from 1950 through 1956, being known as a "spare parts" girl. This meant that viewers saw only specific features of her, such as hands for a fountain pen ad, teeth for a toothpaste commercial, without seeing her whole face and body. The more traditional fashion modeling would continue even after she was an established actress.

Her modeling gigs would lead to a television appearance, on a local Los Angeles program called Hollywood Studio Party during April 1951. Later that year, she was selected as the photo representative for a heavily promoted musical called My L.A., which opened in Los Angeles in early December 1951. Though not a member of the performing cast, Hadley promoted the musical through photo ops and two more television appearances.
Her exposure for the "My L.A." campaign also led to a brief recurring role co-hosting a local KTTV show. She left this program abruptly however to enter a series of beauty contests.
  
The culmination of her modeling career came in Spring 1952, when she won the title of "Miss Los Angeles", and was one of five finalists for that year's "Miss California" contest. This led to more live television appearances in the Los Angeles area.

Early acting career
Hadley's acting career seems to have started at age 21 in March 1952, as the female lead in an original stage production, which is known only from a single advertisement. It was more than two years before she would act again, this time with some summer stock at Tustin, California. The Tustin Playbox, then in its third season, had just been taken over by husband and wife producers Sherwood Price and Cathy Browne. They rejuvenated the community theatre with young Hollywood professionals of their acquaintance, including Hadley. She had featured roles in two productions that season, Blithe Spirit and Petticoat Fever, each of which ran for two weeks. She then had a role in a professionally staged fashion trade show at the Pan-Pacific Auditorium, playing the first female US president.

Television success
Hadley passed over doing summer stock in 1955 in favor of doing television shows. According to columnist Terry Vernon, Hadley's popularity with producers was due to a new gamine style haircut.

A trickle of shows in  1955 became a flood in 1956, including a recurring part on one series. Despite the work load she found time for three stage plays, including two dramas at the Tustin Playbox, Picnic and Come Back, Little Sheba. Her recurring role was a featured one on The Brothers, in which she played the girl friend of the younger brother. The series lasted only twenty-four episodes, of which Hadley appeared in about a third of them.

Her final television appearance in 1956 was for the National Bowl Football Game, held December 15 at the Los Angeles Coliseum. Hadley served as on-camera hostess for the charitable portions of the event, in which all proceeds went to the Kiwanis Crippled Children's Foundation.

Tunnel of Love
Throughout 1957 she continued to average one television performance a month, while still doing stage work. She did a two-week run in Champagne Complex with co-star Joe Flynn under the direction of William Schallert at the Laguna Playhouse, followed by another two weeks doing the same play at the Tustin Playbox.

During October 1957 she opened with the touring company for the then Broadway hit The Tunnel of Love, playing with Tommy Noonan, William Bishop, and Narda Onyx to excellent notices by reviewers. So popular was the play that the tour was postponed for a six-month run at the Alcazar Theatre in San Francisco. Not until April 1958 could the tour resume with a six-week run at the Huntington Hartford Theatre in Los Angeles, where critics were almost as enthused.

Hadley told columnist Gene Sherman that after eight months of continuously wearing a wedding ring for the play, she got used to it and kept it on even after she got engaged for real.

Later career
Following her extended stage run, Hadley returned to a busy television schedule from 1958 thru 1961. Westerns predominated among the many series she acted in, and about which she had some strong opinions, as expressed to interviewer Vernon Scott.

If I didn't work in westerns, I wouldn't be working very often... Except for screaming, and running from heavies into the arms of the hero, there's no opportunity for acting. Once in awhile I get a chance to beat out a fire or fall off a horse. And I've been shot a couple of times, too. I've only been killed twice though. Romance is out of the question. The hero usually gives you a slight kiss at the end of the show, but nothing very passionate because he has to have another girl in the next episode.

Her second film, Frontier Uprising in early 1961, would become a mainstay of television in later decades. She had the female lead opposite Jim Davis, and not for the first time, was cast in a Hispanic role.

Hadley was hired as a regular for The Joey Bishop Show in Summer 1961, and appeared prominently as Joey's girlfriend for the first seven episodes starting in October of that year. However, despite good ratings, she and four other regulars were fired by November 1961, prompting a suggestion that the show be renamed to "Exodus".

From then on television roles were few and far between. She was now thirty-one, an age at which leading women in television who hadn't yet reached full star status either turned to character acting or faded away. From 1962 thru 1966 she had only one or two television roles per year, followed by four years without any screen acting jobs. She did her third film role in 1970, in which she had a small part as Alvy Moore's wife for The Late Liz, followed by two last television appearances.

Personal life
Publicity surrounding her choice as Miss Los Angeles revealed she was 5' 5" tall and weighed 117 pounds at age 21, with brown hair and dark blue eyes. She was a health and exercise enthusiast, which enabled her to continue modeling clothes into her thirties.

Her only marriage was to Pittsburgh born John Gerard Falvo (1928-1990), a teleplay writer with a few acting credits, who was once married to actress Fay Spain. They became engaged by December 1958, and were married in a civil ceremony on February 6, 1959. Columnists announced the couple had sunk their savings into their new production company, Alger Films, which was to make a movie Falvo had written and in which they both would perform. They also bought a home in Sherman Oaks, the address and price of which an indiscreet realtor provided to the newspapers.

The couple had three sons together, but were divorced on December 1, 1971. Hadley appears to have resided in Pasadena, California since retiring from show business.

Stage performances

Filmography

Notes

References

1930 births
Possibly living people
20th-century American actresses
American television actresses
American stage actresses
Actresses from Los Angeles